Joel Pires Quintas Neves (born 1 May 1996) is a Santomean footballer who plays as a defender for Loures and the São Tomé and Príncipe national team.

International career
Neves made his professional debut with the São Tomé and Príncipe national team in a 2–0 2021 Africa Cup of Nations qualification loss to South Africa on 13 November 2020.

References

External links
 
 
 

1996 births
Living people
People from São Tomé
São Tomé and Príncipe footballers
São Tomé and Príncipe international footballers
Association football midfielders
Campeonato de Portugal (league) players
São Tomé and Príncipe expatriate footballers
São Tomé and Príncipe expatriates in Portugal
Expatriate footballers in Portugal